Omar Josué Elvir Casco (born 28 September 1989) is a Honduran football midfielder, who currently plays for F.C. Motagua in the Honduran National League.

Club career
The leftsided midfielder made his professional debut in September 2010 against Vida.

International career
He made his debut for Honduras national football team on 15 November 2020 in a friendly game against Guatemala. He substituted Franklin Flores in the 62nd minute.

Career statistics

Club

References

1989 births
Living people
Sportspeople from Tegucigalpa
Association football midfielders
Honduran footballers
Honduras international footballers
F.C. Motagua players
Liga Nacional de Fútbol Profesional de Honduras players